Lew & Huey is an American watch company with headquarters in Philadelphia.  The microbrand specializes in creating automatic watches, using Asian movements from Tianjin Seagull, Miyota, and Seiko. Its name is a phonetic take on the Chinese Mandarin phrase 'luen huey', meaning reincarnation or rebirth.

History
The company was founded in 2012 by Chris Vail, producing its first run of watches in late 2013.

The initial Kickstarter campaign for the company's first watch, the Riccardo, had reached only $10,781 of its $40,000 goal when it ended on June 16, 2013.  However, a second campaign for the same watch exceeded the same goal after raising $42,699 between June 19 and August 18, 2013.  The company continued to fund many of its new projects via Kickstarter, with its last project ending unsuccessfully in December 2014.

Watch models

Lew & Huey produces automatic watches with Chinese and Japanese movements at price points varying between $325 and $750 USD.

Watch movements

The movements featured in Lew & Huey watches are either Chinese or Japanese. Currently, Miyota, Seiko and Tianjin Seagull movements are employed.

Distribution

As of right now, Lew & Huey watches are only available through direct contact with founder Chris Vail or through the official Lew & Huey website.

References

External links
 

Watch brands
Watch manufacturing companies of the United States